Annayya may refer to:

 Annayya (2000 film), a Tollywood film directed by Mutyala Subbayya
 Annayya (1993 film), a Kannada film directed by Rajendra Singh Babu
 Annayya (cinematographer), on films such as Mahakavi Kalidasu